Diving at the 2022 World Aquatics Championships was held from 26 June to 3 July 2022.

Events
Individual events consisted of preliminaries, semifinals and finals. The order of divers in the preliminary round was determined by computerized random selection, during the technical meeting. The 18 divers with the highest scores in the preliminaries proceeded to the semifinals.

The semifinal consisted of the top 18 ranked divers from the preliminary competition and the final of the top 12 ranked divers from the semifinal.

Schedule
13 events were held.

All time are local (UTC+2).

Medal summary

Medal table

Men

Women

Mixed

References

External links
Official website

 
Diving
Diving at the World Aquatics Championships
WC
Diving competitions in Hungary